Harkes is a surname. Notable people with the surname include:

Erin Harkes (born 1977), American singer-songwriter
Gerbrand Harkes (fl. 1538–1593), Dutch bookseller
John Harkes (born 1967), American soccer player

See also
Harker (surname)
Harkes, Missouri